The State Boat Channel Bridge is a bascule bridge (drawbridge) in Suffolk County, New York, United States. It crosses over the Long Island New York State Boat Channel connecting Captree Island and Jones Beach Island on Robert Moses Causeway in the Oak Beach–Captree area within the town of Babylon.

The  bascule bridge meets the Ocean Parkway at a cloverleaf interchange. This interchange, which provides access to Captree State Park, Gilgo State Park and Jones Beach State Park, served as the southern terminus of the Robert Moses Causeway that leads to the Fire Island Inlet Bridge, the Fire Island Lighthouse, and Robert Moses State Park.

References

State Boat Channel Bridge (Bridgehunter.com)
http://trains.rockycrater.org/cfr/33cfr117.php
http://www.tradewindsfishing.com/directions.cfm
http://www.scribd.com/doc/2748346/Rule-Drawbridge-Operation-Regulations-Longwood-Events-Wedding-Fireworks-Display-Boston-Harbor-Boston-MA

Bridges on Long Island
Road bridges in New York (state)
Bascule bridges in the United States
Bridges in Suffolk County, New York